Team, sometimes stylized as TEAM, is a Slovak rock band led by Pavol Habera. It was founded in 1980 in the city of Martin, in what was then Czechoslovakia. The band won the Zlatý slavík music award in 1989, 1990, and again in 1991. After the success of their first album, Team, in 1988, the band decided to rerecord it in Esperanto. This made it easier for them to travel abroad, especially the UK, as they played at Esperanto meets outside of Czechoslovakia. The song "Držím ti miesto" (I'm Holding You a Spot) from their 1990 album Team 3 was included on the soundtrack of the 2005 American film Hostel.

History

Beginnings
Team was founded by guitarist Dušan Antalík and bassist Ivan Válek in 1980 in the city of Martin. This was part of Czechoslovakia at the time, and is now in Slovakia. The band's first known lineup consisted of Antalík, Válek, as well as singer and keyboardist Milan Dočekal and drummer Ivan Marček. Between 1982 and 1984, the group was inactive as its members had to perform compulsory military service. They got back together in 1985 and recorded their first single, "Beh" (Run). In 1986, they were joined by second keyboardist Bohuš Kantor. They recorded their second single, "Na jednej lodi" (On One Boat), and began preparing their debut album.

Early albums
In 1988, vocalist Pavol Habera joined Team. Most of the material for the band's debut album had already been prepared, and Habera contributed the songs "Máš moje číslo" (You've Got My Number) and "List od Vincenta" (Letter from Vincent), which he originally recorded with his previous band Avion. The record's biggest success was the track "Reklama na ticho" (Silent Advertisement), and the album itself did very well. Team decided to record it again in Esperanto, with the help of new manager Stano Marček.

Their second album, Team 2 - Prichytený pri živote (Caught Alive) saw the replacement of drummer Ivan Marček with Erich Siegel. The album was carried by the singles "Prievan v peňaženke" (Hole in the Wallet) and "Lietam v tom tiež" (I'm in it Too). Siegel also played on Team's next album, Team 3, which spawned the hit "Držím ti miesto" (I'm Holding You a Spot). During this period, the group moved from Opus Records to Tommü Records. Pavol Habera launched a successful solo career in 1990, the same year Team 3 was released.

Team 4, 5, 6
Ivan Marček returned to play on Team's fourth album, Team 4, which was released in 1991. The record was produced by the group independently and recorded at a studio built by Antalík and Dočekal. In 1993, the album Team 5 was released, and included a track sung by Dušan Antalík. In 1995, Team announced they were taking a one-year break.

Upon their return in 1996, Team released the album Team 6 - Voľná zóna (Free Zone). This was the only album without Habera on vocals, with Roman Révai behind the microphone, except for the song "Moc mlada" (Too Young), which was sung by Antalík. It was also the last album with Bohuš Kantor. Milan Dočekal and Ivan Marček also did not take part in the project, with Ďuso Petrus taking over on drums.

Habera's return–present
In 1997, Habera returned to Team. Their next album, Team 7 - 7edem (7even), was released in 2000. It included the hit "Krátke lásky" (Short Loves). A new keyboard player, Juraj Tatár, was added to the group. Marček returned again on drums for the band's next album, Team 8 - Mám na teba chuť :-) (I've Got a Taste for You), which came out in 2002. In addition to the title song, the track "Slovník cudzích snov" (Dictionary of Foreign Dreams) was also a success. In 2003, the band recorded the concert album Team 9 - Live in Praha. This was followed by Team X and Team 11, released in 2004 and 2007, respectively.

In December 2011, the band announced a farewell tour for 2012. Habera stated: "After almost 30 years since the establishment of Team, we want to close one extraordinary and successful chapter of our musical lives, and the best way is to play for our fans." Team planned to play in six Slovak and ten Czech cities. They were accompanied on tour by the band Horská Chata, from Team's hometown of Martin.

In May 2014, longtime drummer Ivan Marček died. His replacement is Marcel Buntaj. The band continues to tour and perform. In 2019, they conducted the Habera & Team 2019 Tour of Czechia and Slovakia.

Band members

Current
 Pavol Habera – vocals, guitar
 Dušan Antalík – guitar, vocals
 Ivan Válek – bass
 Juraj Tatár – keyboards
 Marcel Buntaj – drums
 Matěj Morávek – touring guitarist

Past
 Ivan Marček – drums
 Milan Dočekal – keyboards
 Erich Siegel – drums
 Bohuš Kantor – keyboards
 Roman Révai – vocals
 Ďuso Petrus – drums
 Emil Fratik – drums

Discography

Studio albums
 Team 1 (1988)
 Ora Team (also Team en Esperanto) (1989)
 Team 2 – Prichytený pri živote (1989)
 Team 3 (1990)
 Team 4 (1991)
 Team 5 (1993)
 Team 6 – Voľná zóna (1996)
 Team 7 – 7edem (2000)
 Team 8 – Mám na teba chuť :-) (2002)
 Team X (2004)
 Team 11 (2007)

Live albums
 Team 9 – Live in Praha (2003)

Compilations
 Team – Hity (1994)
 Best of Team (1997)
 Team – Zlaté hity (2000)
 Pavol Habera & Team Best of – Piesne o láske (2002)
 Best Of 1988–2005 (2005)
 Gold (2006)
 Pavol Habera & Team – Největší Hity (2007)
 Team / Prichytený pri živote (2009)
 Od A po Zet (2016)

See also
The 100 Greatest Slovak Albums of All Time

References

External links
  
 

Slovak rock music groups
Slovak pop music groups
Slovak pop rock music groups
Esperanto-language singers
Zlatý slavík winners